Infectious Diseases of Humans: Dynamics and Control is a book by Roy M. Anderson and Robert May, Baron May of Oxford originally published in 1991 by Oxford University Press. It is a seminal text in the mathematical modelling of infectious disease. The book covers both microparasites and macroparasites of humans.

References 

Oxford University Press books